Agaricus aestivalis is a species of fungi in the genus Agaricus. They are found in Germany and are edible.

Description 
The cap measurement averages 5-10 cm across. Its color can range from white to pale ocher in mature fungi.

Further reading 

 https://onlinelibrary.wiley.com/doi/10.1002/jobm.200610296

References

aestivalis

Fungi of Europe
Edible fungi